Basharat is a village and union council, an administrative subdivision, of Chakwal District in the Punjab Province of Pakistan, it is part of Choa Saidan Shah Tehsil.

References

Union councils of Chakwal District
Populated places in Chakwal District